Neviana Stanimirova Vladinova (born 23 February 1994) is a retired Bulgarian individual rhythmic gymnast. She is the 2017 World bronze medalist with ball, and was seventh in the all-around at the Rio 2016 Olympics.

Career

Career beginnings 
Born in Pleven, Bulgaria, Vladinova began competitive gymnastics in 2000. She appeared in international junior competitions in 2006 and began competing as a senior in 2011 season. In 2013, Vladinova competed at the World Cup series and  Grand Prix series. She was in the Bulgarian team that competed at the 2013 European Championships. Vladinova retired on November 17, 2020, due to a neck injury. She is now the second vice president of the BFHG.

2014 season
In 2014, Vladinova made her breakthrough season, her first event at the Moscow Grand Prix she took 4th place in hoop finals. She competed at the 2014 World Cup series in Debrecen, she finished 8th in all-around and qualified in hoop finals. In Stuttgart, she finished 9th in all-around, placed 18th in Pesaro all-around and In Sofia, where she placed 9th in all-around, and qualified to 2 event finals finishing 6th in clubs and 4th in hoop. She competed at the 2014 European Championships where she finished 13th in all-around behind Israeli gymnast Victoria Veinberg Filanovsky. Vladinova competed at the 2014 World Championships with Team Bulgaria finishing 7th, she finished 25th in all-around qualifications, missing out of the top 24 finals. She ended her season competing in the 2014 Grand Prix Final winning bronze in all-around and won 3 apparatus medals: (2 silver: clubs, ribbon), (bronze: ball).

2015 season
On March 21–22, 2015, Vladinova competed at the 2015 Thiais Grand Prix finishing 21st in the all-around. On March 27–29, Vladinova competed at the 2015 Lisboa World Cup finishing 12th in the all-around. On April 10–12, Vladinova finished 24th in the all-around at the 2015 Pesaro World Cup. Vladinova competed at the 2015 Holon Grand Prix finishing 10th in all-around. On May 22–24, Vladinova competed at the 2015 Tashkent World Cup finishing 8th in the all-around. She qualified to 2 apparatus finals. On June 15–21, Vladinova competed at the inaugural 2015 European Games where she finished 12th in the all-around. On August 15–17, Vladinova competed at the 2015 Sofia World Cup and finished 7th in the all-around ahead of Azeri gymnast Marina Durunda. She qualified to all apparatus finals, finishing 5th in ball, 7th in hoop, clubs and 6th in ribbon. At the 2015 World Cup Final in Kazan, Vladinova finished 8th in the all-around. On September 9–13, Vladinova competed at the 2015 World Championships in Stuttgart and finished 10th in the All-around finals with a total of 70.115 points.

2016 season
In 2016, Vladinova began her season competing at the 2016 Grand Prix Moscow finishing 13th in the all-around. On March 17–20, she then competed at the 2016 Lisboa World Cup where she finished 6th in the all-around with a total of 70.250 points, she also qualified to hoop, ribbon and clubs final. On April 1–3, Vladinova competed at the 2016 Pesaro World Cup where she finished 9th in the all-around with a total of 70.550 points. She finished 8th in the all-around (total: 70.500) at the 2016 Minsk World Cup and qualified to all 4 apparatus finals. On May 27–29, Vladinova finished 6th in the all-around at the 2016 Sofia World Cup with a total of 71.250 points, she qualified in 3 apparatus finals finishing 5th in hoop, 6th in ball and won bronze in ribbon, her first World Cup medal. Vladinova then finished 9th in the all-around at the 2016 Guadalajara World Cup and qualified to hoop final. On June 17–19, Vladinova competed at the 2016 European Championships where she finished in 10th place with a total of 71.807 points. On July 22–24, culminating the World Cup of the season in 2016 Baku World Cup, Vladinova finished 6th in the all-around with a total of 71.750 points, she qualified to 3 apparatus finals.

2016 Rio de Janeiro Olympics 
On August 19–20, Vladinova competed at the 2016 Summer Olympics held in Rio de Janeiro, Brazil. She qualified to the rhythmic gymnastics individual all-around final where she finished in 7th place with a total of 70.733 points.

2017 season
In 2017, Vladinova competed at the 2017 Grand Prix Moscow finishing 4th in the all-around and qualified to all the apparatus finals, placing 4th in hoop, ribbon, 5th in ball and 7th in clubs. On March 31 - April 2, Vladinova competed at the 2017 Grand Prix Marbella finishing 4th in the all-around behind Russia's Iuliia Bravikova, she qualified to all the apparatus finals winning 3 silver medal in clubs, ribbon, ball and a bronze in hoop. At the 2017 Pesaro World Cup, Valdinova finished 6th in the all-around behind teammate Katrin Taseva. She also qualified in 2 apparatus finals finishing 4th in ribbon and 6th in ball. In April Vladinova participated in the 2017 Baku World Cup where she won her first all-around medal from a world cup, a bronze. She qualified for all 4 finals, finishing 4th in hoop and clubs, taking another bronze with ball and her first ever title from a WC - a gold with ribbon. A week later Vladinova dominated in the all-around at the 2017 Sofia World Cup claiming her first all-around title, she won 3 more gold medals in the apparatus finals - with hoop, ball and ribbon, and a silver with clubs, thus becoming the winner of the 2017 FIG World Cup in the All-Around, with ball and ribbon. At the same competition, Neviana was also voted "Queen of the world cup" by all the accredited journalists present and was awarded a special tiara. At the 2017 European Championships, Vladinova, along with Katrin Taseva and the Bulgarian junior group (Maria Spasova, Bilyana Vezirska, Bilyana Pisova, Boyana Gelova and Galateya Gerova) won the team all-around bronze medal, behind Russia and Belarus. She qualified in all the apparatus finals finishing 8th in hoop, 4th in ball, 5th in clubs and a bronze in ribbon.  Vladinova competed at the quadrennial held 2017 World Games in Wrocław, Poland from July 20–30, she qualified in all the apparatus finals finishing 8th in hoop, 5th in ball, 7th in clubs and 4th in ribbon. On August 5–7, Vladinova finished 5th in the all-around behind Russia's Iuliia Bravikova at the 2017 Minsk World Challenge Cup, she qualified in all apparatus finals and won gold medal in hoop ahead of Aleksandra Soldatova, she also won silver in clubs, a bronze in ribbon and finished 7th in ball. On August 11–13, Vladinova competed at the 2017 Kazan World Challenge Cup finishing 5th in the all-around behind Linoy Ashram, she qualified in 3 apparatus finals and finished 7th in hoop, ball and ribbon. On August 30 - September 3, Vladinova and Katrin Taseva represented in the individual competitions for Bulgaria at the 2017 World Championships in Pesaro, Italy; she qualified in 3 apparatus finals: finishing 4th in clubs, 5th in hoop and won a bronze medal in ball. Vladinova finished 7th in the all-around final behind Laura Zeng. On November 5–6, Vladinova competed at the 2017 Dalia Kutkaite Cup finishing 4th in the all-around.

2018 season
In 2018, Vladinova sustained an injury early in the season. On April 13–15; she returned to competition at the 2018 Pesaro World Cup finishing 7th in the all-around; she qualified in 3 event finals placing 8th in hoop, 5th in ball and 7th in clubs. On April 20–22, at the 2018 Tashkent World Cup, Vladinova finished 6th in the all-around behind Israel's Nicol Zelikman, she qualified to 3 apparatus finals.

2019 season 
Vladinova finished fourth with hoop at the 2019 European Championships in Baku. At the 2019 World Championships she helped the Bulgarian team to a sixth-place finish.

Retirement 
Vladinova retired from competition in November 2020 due to a neck injury. She is now a vice president of the Bulgarian gymnastics federation.

Detailed Olympic results

Routine music information

Competitive highlights
(Team competitions in seniors are held only at the World Championships, Europeans and other Continental Games.)

References

External links 
 
 
 
 

1994 births
Living people
Bulgarian rhythmic gymnasts
Sportspeople from Pleven
European Games competitors for Bulgaria
Gymnasts at the 2015 European Games
Gymnasts at the 2016 Summer Olympics
Olympic gymnasts of Bulgaria
Medalists at the Rhythmic Gymnastics European Championships
Medalists at the Rhythmic Gymnastics World Championships